Maximiliano Alberto Badell (born August 29, 1988 in La Plata, Argentina) is an Argentine professional footballer currently playing for in the Primera B Metropolitana club Villa San Carlos.

References

External links
 
 

1988 births
Living people
Footballers from La Plata
Argentine footballers
Argentine expatriate footballers
Estudiantes de La Plata footballers
Club Atlético Platense footballers
San Telmo footballers
Provincial Osorno footballers
C.S. Herediano footballers
Expatriate footballers in Chile
Expatriate footballers in Uruguay
Expatriate footballers in Costa Rica
Argentine expatriate sportspeople in Chile
Argentine expatriate sportspeople in Uruguay
Argentine expatriate sportspeople in Costa Rica
Association football forwards